Lukas Bengtsson (born 14 April 1994) is a Swedish professional ice hockey defenseman. He is currently playing with Växjö Lakers of the Swedish Hockey League (SHL).

Playing career 
At the youth level, Bengtsson played for Huddinge IK, Djurgårdens IF, and Mora IK. He logged his first minutes in Sweden’s second-tier league HockeyAllsvenskan with Mora’s men’s team during the 2011–12 season.

In February 2015, he signed with Frölunda HC of Sweden’s top-flight SHL. He made 42 appearances, recording nine goals as well as 12 assists, as Frölunda won the 2016 SHL title. Bengtsson was also influential in the team's success in the Champions Hockey League: He saw the ice in ten contests, scoring two goals and assisting on five more, helping Frölunda capture the CHL title.

On 27 April 2016, he penned a two-year, entry-level contract with the Pittsburgh Penguins of the National Hockey League (NHL).

During the 2016 offseason, Bengtsson was diagnosed with Lyme disease and underwent antibiotic treatment. He began training camp with the Penguins, but soon the disease returned, and he was placed on injured reserve. He underwent another antibiotic treatment and played his first AHL game for the Wilkes-Barre/Scranton Penguins on 13 November 2016. After a 6 January 2017 game during which Bengtsson felt exhaustion and intense pain, he was shut down for the season. Further tests revealed he probably never had Lyme disease; instead, in March 2017, Bengtsson was diagnosed with Postural orthostatic tachycardia syndrome. Bengtsson was able to return to play for Wilkes-Barre/Scranton before the 2017–18 season.

At the conclusion of his entry-level contract with the Penguins, Bengtsson, an impending restricted free agent, opted to return to Sweden, signing a three-year contract with Linköpings HC of the SHL on 18 May 2018. In the 2018–19 season, Bengtsson led the defense of Linköpings in scoring with seven goals and 24 points in 42 games.

Opting for a release from his only season with Linköping HC, Bengtsson was signed to a lucrative two-year contract with Russian club SKA Saint Petersburg of the KHL on 21 May 2019.

Following two seasons with SKA, Bengtsson was traded in the off-season to HC Dinamo Minsk in exchange for Stepan Falkovsky on 16 June 2021. At the end of the season, March 11 left the team. In May 2022, he signed a three-year contract with Växjö Lakers Hockey

Career statistics

Regular season and playoffs

International

References

External links
 

1994 births
Living people
HC Dinamo Minsk players
Frölunda HC players
Linköping HC players
Mora IK players
Ice hockey players at the 2022 Winter Olympics
Olympic ice hockey players of Sweden
SKA Saint Petersburg players
Ice hockey people from Stockholm
Swedish ice hockey defencemen
Wilkes-Barre/Scranton Penguins players